Vlasta Svobodová (born 21 February 1937) is a Czech politician and geologist who served as senator for Brno-City District between 1996 and 1998. She won in the 1996 Czech Senate election, ahead of Communist Party candidate Pavel Pavlík.

References

External links 
RNDr. Vlasta Svobodová at senat.cz 

1937 births
Living people
Civic Democratic Party (Czech Republic) Senators
20th-century Czech women politicians
20th-century Czech politicians